Aspilobapta is a genus of moths in the family Geometridae.

Species
 Aspilobapta sylvicola Djakonov, 1952

References
 Aspilobapta at Markku Savela's Lepidoptera and Some Other Life Forms

Caberini
Geometridae genera